Comitas chuni is a species of sea snail, a marine gastropod mollusk in the family Pseudomelatomidae, the turrids and allies.

Description
The length of the shel lattains 90 mm.

Distribution
This marine species occurs off Sumatra, Indonesia, and off Western Australia.

References

 Martens, E. von 1902. Einige neue Arten von Meer-Conchylien aus den Sammlugen der deutschen Tiefsee-Expedition. Sitzungsberichte der Gesellschaft Naturforschender Freunde zu Berlin 9: 237-244 
 Powell, A.W.B. 1969. The family Turridae in the Indo-Pacific. Part. 2. The subfamily Turriculinae. Indo-Pacific Mollusca 2(10): 207–415, pls 188–324

External links
 
 Biolob.cz: Comitas chuni

chuni
Taxa named by Eduard von Martens
Gastropods described in 1902